Abos or ABOS may refer to:

 Mount Ararat, Abos in ancient Greek authors
 Girolamo Abos, Maltese-Italian composer
 Abos, Pyrénées-Atlantiques, a commune in France
 Abos, a former commune of the Pyrénées-Atlantiques department in France, now part of Peyrelongue-Abos
 Abos, an offensive abbreviation for Australian Aboriginals
 ABOS, Approximation Based On Smoothing - fast and universal approximation / interpolation method for creation of surface from irregularly spaced points
 Anorectic Behavior Observation Scale
 American Board of Orthopaedic Surgery

See also
Abo (disambiguation)